Mariani may refer to:

People with the surname
Amos Mariani (1931-2007), Italian professional football player and coach
Angelo Mariani (chemist), French chemist
Angelo Mariani (conductor) (1821–1873), Italian conductor and composer
Antonio Mariani (17th century), Italian luthier 
Camillo Mariani (1565–1611), Italian sculptor
Carlo Maria Mariani (1931–2021), Italian painter
Carlos Mariani (born 1957), Minnesota politician and Representative
Carolina Mariani (born 1972), Argentine retired female judoka
Cesare Mariani (1826–1901), Italian painter
Davide Mariani (born 1991), Swiss footballer of Italian and Mexican descent
Domenico Mariani (1863–1939), Roman Catholic Church Cardinal
Edoardo Mariani (1893-1957), Italian footballer
Enrico Mariani, Italian rower
Enus Mariani (born 1998), Italian gymnast
Felice Mariani (footballer) (1918–1997), Italian professional football player
Felice Mariani (judoka) (born 1954),  Italian former judoka
Gindetta Mariani (1870–1950), Italian mycologist
Giorgio Mariani (1946-2011), Italian professional footballer 
Giovanni Maria Mariani, Italian Baroque artist
Giuseppe Mariani (doctor) (1885–1963), Italian doctor and medical researcher
Giuseppe Mariani (art director) (fl. 1952–1992), Italian art director
Gregorio Mariani (1833-1902), Italian painter
Joseph Mariani, French researcher in Computer Science
Lorenzo Mariani, American stage director of opera 
Luciano Mariani (1801-1859), Italian operatic bass
Luiza Mariani (born 1980), Brazilian actress and producer
Marc Mariani (born 1987), American football player
Marcella Mariani (1936-1955), Italian actress and winner of the 1953 Miss Italy edition
Marco Mariani (curler) (born 1968), Italian curler
Marco Mariani (footballer) (born 1992), Italian professional footballer 
Mario Mariani (born 1970), Italian pianist, composer, and performer
Maurilio Mariani (born 1973), Italian athlete
Orazio Mariani (1915–1981), Italian athlete
Paul Mariani (born 1940), American biographer and poet
Philippe Mariani, CEO of Genesis Investment Company (B.S.C.)
Piero Mariani (footballer) (1911–1990), Italian professional football player
Pompeo Mariani (1857-1927), Italian painter
Robb Mariani, American television personality, interior designer and television host 
Robert D. Mariani (born 1950), American lawyer and a U.S. District Judge
Rosa Mariani (1799-1864), Italian coloratura contralto opera singer 
Simone Mariani (born 1964), Italian-American actor, writer, director and producer
Siti Mariam binti Ismail (1933-2015), Malaysian-Singaporean Malay actress, singer and model 
Teodoro Mariani (1882-1916),  Italian rower
Thierry Mariani (born 1958), French politician
Virginia Mariani Campolieti (1869-1941), alian pianist, orchestra conductor and composer
Virginia Barlocci Ricardi (1824–1898), Italian painter, active in Rome
Mariani Maximin (1914-2011), Caribbean politician

Places 
Mariani, Jorhat, of Assam, India
Mariani, a residential Art Deco sector in Barrio Primero in Ponce, Puerto Rico

Other 
Villa Mariani, located in Bordighera, Province of Imperia, Italy
Vin Mariani, a tonic drink created by chemist Angelo Mariani
Mariani, the Latin term for the supporters of the Roman general Gaius Marius
Mariani College, general degree college established in 1966 at Mariani, in Jorhat district, Assam
Mariani (Vidhan Sabha constituency), one of the 126 assembly constituencies of Assam Legislative Assembly
Guwahati–Mariani Intercity Express, an Express train belonging to Indian Railways Northeast Frontier Railway zone, in India

Italian-language surnames
Patronymic surnames